Lizo is a given name. Notable people with the name include:

Lizo Gqoboka (born 1990) South African rugby union player
Lizo Makhosi (born 1999), South African cricketer
Lizo Mjempu (born 1984), South African footballer
Lizo Mzimba, English journalist and television presenter